The checker barb (Oliotius oligolepis) is a species of cyprinid fish endemic to creeks, rivers, and lakes in Sumatra, Indonesia.  It has also been established in the wild in Colombia.  The adult males have red fins with black tips.  It will grow up to a length of  TL.  This species is the only known member of its genus.

Etymology
The genus name Oliotius is derived as a combination of a portion of the specific epithet oligolepis and its former genus name Puntius.

The common name "checker barb" (as well as such related names as "checkered barb", "chequer barb" and "checkerboard barb") derives from the black marks on its side similar in appearance to those found on a checkerboard.

Taxonomic issue
This species has sometimes been placed in the genus Barbus though Barbus oligolepis Battalgil, 1941 properly refers to another fish species that is only found in Turkey.  Since Bleeker's oligolepis is not placed in Barbus, both names are valid.

Habitat
Checker barbs natively live in a tropical climate and prefer water with a pH of 6.0 - 6.5, a water hardness of 10.0 dGH, and a temperature range of 68–75 °F (20–24 °C). Their omnivorous diet consists of small worms, crustaceans, insects, and plants.

An egg-scattering fish, they spawn early in the morning on plants that are the center of the male's territory.  Once the spawning is completed, the pair will attempt to eat the eggs that they can find.

In the aquarium
The checker barb has commercial importance in the aquarium trade industry; this peaceful fish is sometimes used in community tanks by fish keeping hobbyists. The checker barb is a schooling fish that is well suited to a community aquarium.  It requires warm (75-77 °F), soft to medium-hard water.  It occupies the medium to lower levels  of the aquarium and is an omnivore, doing well on processed foods. The checker barb is a prolific egg-scatterer that lends itself well to the novice breeder.

See also
List of freshwater aquarium fish species

References

External links
Photos from Fishbase

Cyprinid fish of Asia
Freshwater fish of Indonesia
Fishkeeping
Fish described in 1853
Taxa named by Pieter Bleeker